Stony Plain (Lichtner Farms) Airport  is located just west of Stony Plain, Alberta, Canada.

See also
 List of airports in the Edmonton Metropolitan Region

References

Registered aerodromes in Alberta
Parkland County